U.S. Route 6 (US 6) within the state of Connecticut runs for  from the New York state line near Danbury to the Rhode Island state line in Killingly. West of Hartford, the route either closely parallels or runs along Interstate 84 (I-84), which has largely supplanted US 6 as a through route in western Connecticut. East of Hartford, US 6 serves as a primary route for travel between Hartford and Providence.

Route description

Western Connecticut
US 6 enters Connecticut paired with US 202 from the town of Southeast, New York, just east of the village of Brewster. The concurrency runs for  through the city of Danbury as a minor arterial road before it forms a  four-way concurrency with I-84 and US 7 from I-84 exit 4 to exit 7. At exit 7, US 7 and US 202 split to the north, while US 6 stays duplexed with I-84 for another  before returning to surface roads at exit 8. The route then goes through the towns of Bethel and Newtown.

It then passes through the northern Waterbury area suburbs of Woodbury, Watertown, and Thomaston. US 6 has a  overlap with the Route 8 expressway in Thomaston.

Hartford area
After leaving the Route 8 expressway, US 6 continues as an alternating two- and four-lane surface road through the towns of Plymouth, Bristol, and Farmington.

Eastern Connecticut
In Bolton, US 6 and US 44 split. US 44 follows a more northerly route while US 6 continues through Bolton, Coventry, Andover, and Columbia. It intersects with Route 316 and Route 87 along the way and mostly follows the Hop River.

The US 6 Willimantic bypass begins in Columbia, at a four-way at-grade intersection with Route 66. The expressway starts out heading northeast and immediately crosses into Coventry. After crossing the town line, the eastbound and westbound sides of US 6 split, with a hill in between them. At the split, the eastbound side of the expressway curves and heads east. At this point, Hop River State Park Trail passes under both sides of the expressway. Soon after, the westbound lane also curves, and the two sides of the expressway soon become parallel again. The expressway then crosses the Willimantic River and enters the town of Windham. Right after entering Windham, it overpasses the New England Central Railroad. Immediately after this, there is an interchange with Route 32. After the interchange, the expressway enters Mansfield and passes under Mansfield Avenue before encountering another interchange for Route 195. The eastbound exit and westbound entrance use Mansfield City Road, while the westbound exit accesses Route 195 via North Frontage Road and eastbound access to US 6 is from Route 195 itself. Soon after the eastbound entrance ramp joins US 6, the expressway crosses the Natchaug River and once again enters Windham. The US 6 Willimantic bypass ends  after entering Windham at an interchange with the eastern end of Route 66, whose roadway US 6 assumes east of the interchange. US 6 then continues as a surface road through the towns of Chaplin, Hampton, and Brooklyn. Just before the Rhode Island state line, the unsigned portion of the Connecticut Turnpike (SR 695) merges into US 6 eastbound as it enters the town of Foster

History

Before the creation of the U.S. Numbered Highway System in 1926, most of the proposed routing in Connecticut was part of New England Route 3 (Route 3). There were two places where Route 3 and US 6 were not overlapped. Route 3 began in Bedford, New York, at New York State Route 22, entering Connecticut via modern Route 35. Route 3 continued north to Danbury via the old non-expressway alignment of US 7. US 6, on the other hand, went east from Brewster on its current alignment, meeting with Route 3 in downtown Danbury.

Another difference in routing is between Manchester and Windham. US 6 originally used a more northern alignment via Coventry, running along present US 44 then modern Route 31. Route 3 used current US 6 for its routing. East of Windham, the routes overlapped into Rhode Island. Between 1926 and 1932, Route 3 and US 6 were cosigned where they overlapped. Route 3 was finally deleted in 1932.

Willimantic bypass

I-84 was to be an expressway that would connect the modern I-384 with the modern US 6 Willimantic bypass. From here, I-84 would continue to Providence, Rhode Island. This idea was planned in the 1960s but abandoned in 2005.

The Connecticut Department of Transportation (CTDOT) had planned since the 1960s to upgrade the segment between Bolton and Columbia to an expressway, connecting I-384 to the existing expressway segment in Windham. However, this particular segment of US 6 passes through an environmentally sensitive area centered around the Hop River. Construction had been planned to begin in the late 1980s, but federal, state, and local officials could not reach an agreement on a feasible route that avoided the Hop River wetlands and development within the towns of Andover, Bolton, Coventry, and Columbia.  The affected towns, CTDOT, and the Connecticut Department of Environmental Protection (DEP) favored a northern alignment (Alternative 133B), which would avoid the town centers and nearby wetlands. The Environmental Protection Agency, U.S. Army Corps of Engineers (USACE), and Federal Highway Administration (FHWA) favored a southerly alignment (Alternative 133 18/25) that would cut through residential and commercial areas as well as the Hop River's adjoining wetlands.

Despite opposition from CTDOT, DEP, and affected towns, the FHWA issued a record of decision and USACE issued required permits for Alternative 133 18/25 (southern alignment) in 2001. State and local officials continued to press USACE to approve the northern alignment. Due to the impasse between state, local, and federal officials, federal funds for the bypass were withdrawn in 2003. In 2005, the Capitol Region Council of Governments and CTDOT removed the US 6 bypass from planning, hence CTDOT effectively abandoned further study of the bypass in lieu of upgrading the existing road.

In 2007, CTDOT began making safety improvements and capacity upgrades to the existing US 6 through Andover, Bolton, and Columbia.

Major intersections
Exit numbers are signed throughout the route's overlap with I-84.

Special routes

There have been several routes signed as US 6A in the state. No special routes currently exist.
Newtown–Southbury: Original surface routing before creation of expressway later to become I-84; currently SR 816.
Plymouth–Hartford: Now US 6. At this time, the old US 6 went along Route 64 to downtown Waterbury then along Route 10 to Farmington.
Woodbury–Willimantic: West of Meriden, this was the original alignment of US 6. When US 6 was reassigned to the former US 6A from Plymouth to Farmington, this became US 6A. This US 6A was subsequently extended through Meriden to Willimantic along modern Route 66. An expressway upgrade was planned for this US 6A. Only a portion of the highway was built and is now I-691. Between Woodbury and Waterbury this section is now Route 64.
Coventry–Windham: Became US 6A when Route 3 was deleted. Swapped with the old US 6 in 1939 and finally deleted in 1942 when US 6A became Route 31.
Danielson: Old routing prior to construction of the two-lane freeway.

References

External links

 Connecticut
06
Transportation in Hartford County, Connecticut
Transportation in Tolland County, Connecticut
Transportation in Litchfield County, Connecticut
Transportation in Fairfield County, Connecticut
Transportation in New Haven County, Connecticut
Transportation in Windham County, Connecticut
Transportation in Windham, Connecticut